Al-Rusafa (also spelled Rusafa, Rassafah, Resafe, Rosafeh) refers to the following places in the Middle East:

Al-Rusafa, Syria, a village and ruined fortress in northwestern Syria
Resafa, an archaeological site in north-central Syria
Al-Rusafa, Iraq, a region of Baghdad, Iraq